Flad Architects is a national architectural firm with offices in Madison, Wisconsin; Atlanta, Georgia; Gainesville and Tampa, Florida; Raleigh, North Carolina; San Francisco, California, Seattle, Washington; and New York, New York. In addition to architectural design, Flad offers interior design, landscape architecture, master planning, strategic planning, structural engineering, and sustainable design services. The firm is involved in multiple markets and building types including: corporate, healthcare, higher education, science and technology, and the federal government.

Flad is ranked number 1 in the nation for science and technology (S+T) laboratory facility architecture and architecture/engineering (AE) firms, as reported in Building Design+Construction's 2022 Giants 400 Report. Flad is among Building Design + Construction’s Top 50 Architectural and Engineering firms and is ranked number 170 on the Engineering News-Record’s list of the “Top 500 Design Firms, and number 16 on the “Top 100 Green Firms.”

History
John J. Flad was born and educated in Madison. He apprenticed with Madison architects, James O. Gordon, in 1907 and briefly with Robert Wright before working at Chicago firms from 1909 to 1914. He returned to Madison to work under Alvan E. Small until 1917; worked two years as Wisconsin State Architect; then rejoined Small until 1926. As part of Flad & Small, Flad designed the St. Bernard's Roman Catholic Church at 2460 Atwood in Madison. 
He also apprenticed with Frank Lloyd Wright.

Flad & Moulton
From 1926 until 1932, Flad partnered with Frank S. Moulton (1891-1981) to form Flad & Moulton. The firm produced several surviving buildings including South School (Reedsburg, Wisconsin) at 420 Plum Street (a Works Progress Administration funded project), the 1931 remodel of the Dowling Apartment Building (originally constructed in 1922) in Dane County, Wisconsin; the U.S. Post Office and Federal Courthouse (Madison, Wisconsin) and the Madison Catholic Association Clubhouse. Moulton designed the Reedsburg Municipal Hospital built in 1932, and  his later work included the University of Wisconsin Memorial Union, University Hospital, and Student Nurses' Dormitory all on the University of Wisconsin campus.

National Register of Historic Places listed buildings by the firm (with attribution) include:
 Dowling Apartment Building, 445-447 W. Wilson St., Madison, WI (Flad and Moulton) 
 Grimm Book Bindery, 454 W. Gilman St., Madison, WI (J Flad & Asso.) 
 One or more works in Shorewood Historic District, roughly bounded by Lake Mendota Dr., Tallyho Ln., Shorewood Blvd., and the Blackhawk Country Club, Village of Shorewood Hills, WI, (John J. Flad)
 One or more works in Waterloo Downtown Historic District, jct. of Madison and Monroe Sts., Waterloo, WI (John J. Flad & Son)

Flad & Associates
Flad & Associates first designs were churches and residential homes throughout the Madison, Wisconsin area, and St. Bernard's Church was the first church designed by the firm. Another prominent building Flad designed was the Erickson Home for the Madison Small Homes Bureau, which was recognized by Architectural Forum magazine in 1936. Flad designed the Madison Catholic Association Clubhouse constructed in 1938 at 15 East Wilson Street, later known as the Diocese of Madison Chancery Building.

In the 1950s and 1960s Flad grew from a local practice to a regional practice and began specializing in higher education and healthcare projects throughout the Midwest.  That specialization continues today on a more national scale. Early projects included Beloit Memorial Hospital in Beloit, Wisconsin, and the University of Wisconsin-Madison, Edward Burr Van Vleck Mathematics Building.  Flad also designed the Parker Pen Company World's Fair Pavilion for the 1964 New York World's Fair.

In the late 1970s and early 1980s, the firm made a conscious decision to expand their experience designing hospital labs into a more global science and technology lab specialization designing corporate offices, data centers, training centers, and science and technology laboratories.  Flad's first research laboratory project was the USDA Dairy Forage Science Center.

In 1985 Joe Flad, son of John Flad, sold the practice to five of his employees, transforming Flad & Associates into an employee-owned firm.

Flad became a member of the U.S. Green Building Council (USGBC) in 1994 and played a role in the development of the original Leadership in Energy and Environmental Design (LEED) version 1.0 Building Rating System in 1996–1998. In 1998, the firm participated in the LEED Pilot Program to beta test the new rating systems with its Pharmacia Life Sciences Building project. Pharmacia's building became the first research facility to achieve LEED certification and was awarded a LEED Gold rating in 2001.

In 2004, Flad expanded its science and technology design services to include advanced energy research to develop clean energy sources, enhanced technologies and improved fuel efficiency.
Two of the firm's energy research lab designs are Stony Brook University, Advanced Energy Research & Technology Center (AERTC) and the National Renewable Energy Laboratory (NREL), Integrated Biorefinery Research Facility.

In 2008 the firm changed its name from Flad & Associates to Flad Architects.

Awards
Eight of the firm's projects have been recognized in the Lab of the Year competition, held by R&D Magazine:

R&D Magazine - 2011 Lab of the Year High Honors, University of California, Davis, Teaching and Research Winery and the August A. Busch III Brewing and Food Science Laboratory (WBF); Davis, California

R&D Magazine - 2008 Lab of the Year High Honors, Indiana University (Bloomington), Multidisciplinary Science Building - Simon Hall; Bloomington, Indiana

R&D Magazine - 2002 Renovated Lab of the Year, Bayer Corporation, Building 36; West Haven, Connecticut

R&D Magazine - 2001 Lab of the Year Special Mention, Lab Planning and Sustainability, Pharmacia Building Q; Skokie, Illinois

R&D Magazine - 1999 Lab of the Year, Chiron Corporation Life Sciences Building; Emeryville, California

R&D Magazine - 1996 Lab of the Year High Honors, Genentech Research Facility; South San Francisco, California

R&D Magazine - 1989 Lab of the Year High Honors, Bausch & Lomb Optics Research Center; Rochester, New York

R&D Magazine - 1982 Lab of the Year Special Mention, USDA Dairy Forage Research Laboratory; Madison, Wisconsin

Notable Projects
Academic

Indiana University (Bloomington), Multidisciplinary Science Buildings - Simon Hall (MSB I) and MSB II; Bloomington, Indiana

University of California, Davis Department of Viticulture and Enology, Viticulture & Encology Research and Teaching Winery, and Anheuser Busch Brewing and Food Pilot Facility; Davis, California

University of Connecticut, Lodewick Visitor's Center; Storrs, Connecticut

University of Wisconsin-Madison, Biochemistry Building I & II; Madison, Wisconsin

University of Wisconsin-Madison, DC Smith Greenhouses; Madison, Wisconsin

University of Wisconsin-Madison, Vilas Communications Hall; Madison, Wisconsin

Purdue University, Discovery Park (Purdue), Bindley Bioscience Center; West Lafayette, Indiana

Healthcare

Genesis Health System, Genesis Heart Institute; Davenport, Iowa

Shands at the University of Florida, Shands Cancer Center; Gainesville, Florida

SSM Health Care, St. Mary's Hospital, Satellite Emergency Center; Sun Prairie, Wisconsin

Affinity Health System; Neenah, Wisconsin

H. Lee Moffitt Cancer Center & Research Institute; Tampa, Florida

Life Sciences

Eli Lilly and Company; Indianapolis, Indiana; Lafayette, Indiana; Greenfield, Indiana; and Research Triangle Park, North Carolina

Amgen Helix Campus; Seattle, Washington

Genentech Fill/Finish Facility; Hillsboro, Oregon

Genentech Science Process Center; South San Francisco, California

Boehringer Ingelheim; Ridgefield, Connecticut

ZymoGenetics; Seattle, Washington

Bayer Corporation; West Haven, Connecticut

US Army Medical Research Institute of Chemical Defense; Aberdeen Proving Ground, Maryland

Johnson & Johnson Research Center One; Springhouse, Pennsylvania

Technology

Kettle Foods, Processing Plant; Beloit, Wisconsin

Stony Brook University Advanced Energy Research & Technology Center; Stony Brook, New York

Pacific Northwest National Laboratory, Physical Sciences Facility; Richland, Washington

Workplace

ACT (test) Corporate Headquarters; Iowa City, Iowa

Bayer Corporation; West Haven, Connecticut

American Family Insurance Headquarters; Madison, Wisconsin

References

External links
 Official website
 Noteworthy
 Article, "Rethinking Project Delivery: Integrated Teams Help Manage Risk, Maximize Investments"
 CoreNet “The Leader” article, "It's the Economy, Stupid (or is it about Strategy?)"
 Whitepaper, "Increasing the Sustainability of Energy Research Laboratories"
 Article, "Going Beyond Leadership in Energy and Environmental Design (LEED): Sustainable Laboratory Design"
 Article, "Advanced Degree, Rethinking the Academic Medical Center"

Architecture firms based in Wisconsin
Companies based in Madison, Wisconsin
Design companies established in 1927